The Rotuman forest gecko or Rotuma forest gecko (Lepidodactylus gardineri) is a species of gecko. It is endemic to Rotuma Island (Fiji). It is named after John Stanley Gardiner.

References

Lepidodactylus
Reptiles of Fiji
Endemic fauna of Fiji
Reptiles described in 1897
Taxa named by George Albert Boulenger